Angelos Zioulis (born 1 February 1995) is a Greek professional footballer who plays as a centre-back for Super League 2 club Chania.

Honours 
PAS Giannina

 Super League Greece 2: 2019–20

References

1995 births
Living people
Greek expatriate footballers
Cypriot Second Division players
Football League (Greece) players
Super League Greece 2 players
Panetolikos F.C. players
AO Chania F.C. players
PAS Giannina F.C. players
Association football defenders
Footballers from Athens
Greek footballers